Benj Hellie's vertiginous question is as follows: of all the subjects of experience out there, why is this one—the one corresponding to the human being referred to as Benj Hellie—the one whose experiences are live? (The reader is supposed to substitute their own case for Hellie's.)

A simple response to this question is that it reduces to "Why are Hellie's experiences live from Hellie's perspective," which is trivial to answer. However, Hellie argues, through a parable, that this response leaves something out. The parable describes two situations, one reflecting a broad global constellation view of the world and everyone's phenomenal features, and one describing an embedded view from the perspective of a single subject. The former seems to align better with the simple response above, but the latter seems a better description of consciousness.

David Chalmers has written a response to Hellie, but he did not address the question itself. Hellie's argument is also closely related to Caspar Hare's theories of egocentric presentism and perspectival realism, of which several other philosophers have written reviews.
Similar questions are also asked repeatedly by J.J. Valberg in justifying his horizonal view of the self.

See also 
 Binding problem
 Further facts
 Indexicality
 Metaphysical subjectivism
 Personal identity
 Open individualism
 Subjective idealism
 Solipsism

References

External links 
 Hellie, Benj. Against egalitarianism. Preprint of article in Analysis (2013).
 Benj Hellie's page at the University of Toronto.

Metaphysics of mind
Subjective experience
Philosophical problems
Open problems
Identity (philosophy)
Theory of mind
Conceptions of self
Mind–body problem
Consciousness studies